Sarcopteryx montana is a species of rainforest tree in north-eastern Queensland, Australia.
The Latin specific epithet montana refers to mountains or coming from mountains.

References

External links

Sapindaceae
Sapindales of Australia
Trees of Australia
Flora of Queensland
Taxa named by Sally T. Reynolds